The 27th New Jersey Infantry Regiment was an American Civil War infantry regiment from New Jersey that served a nine-month enlistment in the Union Army. It was the only nine-month Regiment from New Jersey with an eleventh Company ("Company L").

The 27th New Jersey Infantry Regiment was recruited from various towns within Morris County, New Jersey and Sussex County, New Jersey, and was mustered into Federal service on September 3, 1862, in Newark, except Company G (Village of Boonton, then part of Pequannock Township) and Company I (Village of Morristown, Morris Township). The regiment trained at Camp Frelinghuysen in Newark before being sent out to join the Army of the Potomac. There, it was attached to the 2nd brigade with Casey's Division, Defenses of Washington, D. C until December, 1862. Next, it was attached to the 9th Army Corps, Army of the Potomac until March 1863 and Army of the Ohio until June 1863.

When their term of service expired in June, the 27th volunteered to remain for 1 more month during the time of the "Pennsylvania Emergency", when Lee's army threatened the north. The 27th was on duty first in Wheeling, West Virginia, then they moved to Pittsburgh, Pennsylvania, and finally to guard a bridge at Harrisburg, Pennsylvania, June 26, 1863.

The regiment fought in one engagement: the December 1862 Battle of Fredericksburg.

After serving its nine-month enlistment, the regiment was mustered out on July 2, 1863. Many of the veterans of the 27th New Jersey went on to serve in other regiments, most notably the 33rd New Jersey Volunteer Infantry, which was led by Colonel George W. Mindil and the 39th New Jersey Volunteer Infantry.

The Regiment lost 33 members on May 6, 1863, while crossing the Cumberland River in Kentucky. Only the bodies of 7 of those that drowned were recovered and buried at the Mill Springs National Cemetery, Logan Cross Roads, Kentucky. 19 members from Company L, which was recruited mostly from Rockaway Township, were memorialized in the Rockaway Presbyterian Church cemetery.
There is a large Standing Soldier Monument in Sparta of a Civil War soldier that was erected in 1900 by James R. Titman, a member of the 27th and 33rd Regiments of the New Jersey Volunteers. The monument honors all the brave soldiers who served on land and sea in defense of their country in any of the wars of the US.

Original Field and Staff
Mustered in September 1862:

Colonel George W. Mindil
Lieutenant Colonel Edwin S. Babcock
Major Augustus D. Blanchet - originally vacant
Adjutant J. Kearney Smith
Quartermaster James B. Titman
Surgeon John B. Richmond
Assistant Surgeon J. Henry Stiger
Assistant Surgeon Charles H. Sudyam
Chaplain John Faull
Sergeant Major John H. Medcraft

Original company commanders
Company A - Captain Charles F. Fernald
First Lieutenant Thamer Snover
Second Lieutenant Robert M. Pettitt
Company B - Captain John T. Alexander
First Lieutenant Jacob M. Stewart
Second Lieutenant George Hance
Company C - Captain Nelson H. Drake
First Lieutenant Ferdinand V. Wolfe
Second Lieutenant David S. Allen
Company D - Captain Thomas Anderson
First Lieutenant Nathaniel K. Bray
Second Lieutenant John B. Grover
Company E - Captain Augustus Blanchet
First Lieutenant George W. Crane
Second Lieutenant Hudson Kitchell
Company F - Captain Daniel Bailey
First Lieutenant George W. Cooke
Second Lieutenant James Peters
Company G - Captain James Plant
First Lieutenant George S. Esten
Second Lieutenant George Anthony
Company H - Captain Samuel Dennis
First Lieutenant John M. Rosencrance
Second Lieutenant Jesse Rosencrance
Company I - Captain Alfred H. Condict
First Lieutenant Peter Churchfield
Second Lieutenant David H. Ayres
Company K - Captain Henry A. Franks
First Lieutenant Sydney Smith
Second Lieutenant Edward S. Baldwin
Company L - Captain Henry F. Willis
First Lieutenant Stephen H. Marsh
Second Lieutenant Joseph C. Bower

See also

List of New Jersey Civil War Units

Notes

Units and formations of the Union Army from New Jersey
1862 establishments in New Jersey
Military units and formations established in 1862
Military units and formations disestablished in 1863